Georgetown, MD, may refer to a community in the United States:

 Georgetown (Washington, D.C.), a former town in Maryland which became part of the District of Columbia upon its creation
 Georgetown, Maryland, an unincorporated community in northeastern Kent County
 Georgetown (CDP), Maryland, a census-designated place in western Kent County